"Escápate" (English: Run Away) is the second single from Flex's studio album Te Quiero: Romantic Style In Da World released on November, 2007. The song has been chosen as the album's first single, long before the album was released; however, it was later announced that "Te Quiero" had been chosen as the first single instead.

Music video
 
The music video was filmed in July, 2006 before to "Te Quiero" and "Sin Tu Amor" were filmed and released as a singles, but released to 2007, it was filmed at a nightclub in Panama directed by Music video directors Lucho Espada and Alvis González.

Charts

References

External links 

Flex (singer) songs
2007 singles
Songs written by Flex (singer)
2007 songs
EMI Latin singles